The Montenegro men's national handball team represents Montenegro in international handball competitions. The national team was formed in 2006 recently after the Montenegrin independence.

National handball team of Montenegro made their historical debut matches in the January 2007. Except the qualifying matches, Montenegro played on the two greatest global tournaments - World Championship and the European Championship

Records 

Largest victory 41:27,  – , 6 January 2007, Budva

Largest defeat 39:23,  – , 24 January 2011, Stavanger

Largest away victory 31:37,  – , 29 November 2008, Rize

Largest home defeat 28:39,  – , 8 June 2011, Pljevlja

Longest unbeaten streak 9 matches, (3 January 2007 - 18 January 2008)

Longest losing streak 7 matches, (14 June 2015 - 6 November 2016)

Most scored goals in a match 41,  –  41:27

Most goals against in a match 39,  –  28:39,  – 

Highest home attendance approx. 6,000,  –  33:25, 17 April 2022, Podgorica

Highest away attendance 11,835,  –  37:26, 13 April 2019, Copenhagen

Lowest home attendance 800,  –  24:24, 24 October 2018, Podgorica (note: excluding matches during COVID-19 pandemic)

Lowest away attendance 300,  –  29:26, 16 January 2010, Alcamo (note: excluding matches during COVID-19 pandemic)

Results

Below is the list of all official matches of Montenegro national handball team.

Montenegro vs. other countries

During its history, Montenegrin national handball team played against 31 various countries.

Most matches, Montenegro played against Sweden (9), Israel (6) and Russia (6).

Updated till 29 February 2020

Tournaments
During the past, Montenegro participated on the next official (EHF/IHF) tournaments:
2007 - Qualifiers for Euro 2008
2008 - European Championship 2008
2008 - Qualifiers for World Championship 2009
2008/09 - Qualifiers for Euro 2010
2010 - Qualifiers for World Championship 2011
2010/11 - Qualifiers for Euro 2012
2012 - Qualifiers for World Championship 2013
2012/13 - Qualifiers for Euro 2014
2013 - World Championship 2013
2014 - European Championship 2014
2014 - Qualifiers for World Championship 2015
2014/15 - Qualifiers for Euro 2016
2016 - European Championship 2016
2016 - Qualifiers for World Championship 2017
2016/17 - Qualifiers for Euro 2018
2018 - European Championship 2018
2018 - Qualifiers for World Championship 2019
2018/19 - Qualifiers for Euro 2020
2020 - European Championship 2020

Updated: Feb 29, 2020

See also 
 Montenegro men's national handball team
 Handball Federation of Montenegro
 Montenegro women's national handball team

Montenegro
Handball in Montenegro
Montenegro